Warbelow's Air Ventures is an American regional airline based in Fairbanks, Alaska, United States. It operates domestic scheduled passenger, charter, and tour services as well as flight tours, mostly throughout Interior Alaska. Its base is Fairbanks International Airport.

History
The company was founded by Marvin E. Warbelow in 1958.  It operated as 40-Mile Air (in reference to the Fortymile River) from 1970 to 1989, when it was split into two companies by Marvin's sons Charlie and Art.  The base in Fairbanks, Alaska operated by Art Warbelow then assumed the name Warbelow's Air Ventures, Inc..  The base in Tok, Alaska continued to operate under the 40-Mile Air, Ltd. name.  It was subsequently sold by Charlie Warbelow and continues to operate, mostly serving destinations along the Alaska portion of the Alaska Highway.

Fleet
The Warbelow's Air Ventures fleet consists of at least 16 planes (9 of which are operated by the Warbelow's subsidiary Air Arctic), and includes the following:

 15 Piper PA-31 Navajo Chieftain

Destinations
All destinations are in Alaska. The airline provides Essential Air Service from Fairbanks to Central, Circle, Minto.

 Beaver (WBQ) - Beaver Airport
 Central (CEM) - Central Airport
 Circle (IRC) - Circle City Airport
 Fairbanks (FAI) - Fairbanks International Airport (hub)
 Fort Yukon (FYU) - Fort Yukon Airport
 Manley (MLY) - Manley Airport
 Minto (MNT) - Minto Airport
 Rampart (RMP) - Rampart Airport
 Stevens Village (SVS) - Stevens Village Airport

See also
 List of airlines of Alaska

References

External links
 

1958 establishments in Alaska
Airlines established in 1958
Airlines based in Alaska
Companies based in Fairbanks, Alaska
Regional airlines of the United States
American companies established in 1958